Zhonghe is a town of Gaolan County, Gansu, China. It is located 15 km from Lanzhou city centre. The town has an mountainous landscape and arid climate. About half of its arable land is irrigated. Owing to its location near Lanzhou, it has been developed into a logistics base. China National Highway 109 forms the transport artery of the town.

Planning documents of Lanzhou city government indicate that Zhonghe will be fully integrated in the urban area of Lanzhou. The town may become part of Anning District. The Lanzhou Zoo is being relocated to Zhonghe.

Administrative divisions 
Zhonghe governs one residential community and 8 villages:

 Yanchi residential community
 Zhonghe village
 Yachuan village
 Fengdeng village
 Pingxian village
 Liuhe village
 Yanchi village
 Luoguan village
 Shuiyuan village

References 

Township-level divisions of Gansu